A Joyous Entry (or) is the official name used for the ceremonial royal entry, the first official peaceable visit of a reigning monarch, prince, duke or governor into a city, mainly in the Duchy of Brabant or the County of Flanders and occasionally in France, Luxembourg, Hungary, or Scotland, usually coinciding with recognition by the monarch of the rights or privileges to the city and sometimes accompanied by an extension of them.

The most recent Joyous Entries took place in 2013 in honour of the Belgian king.

Ceremonial reception
A Joyous Entry is a particular form of, and title for, the general phenomenon of ceremonial entries into cities by rulers or their representatives, which were celebrated with enormous pageantry and festivities throughout Europe from at least the late Middle Ages on. The leading artists available designed temporary decorated constructions such as triumphal arches, groups of musicians and actors performed on stands at which the procession halted, the houses on the processional route decorated themselves with hangings, flowers were thrown, and fountains flowed with wine. The custom began in the Middle Ages and continued until the French Revolution, although less often in Protestant counties after the Reformation. A formal first visit to a city by an inheritor of the throne of Belgium upon his accession and since 1900 for a crown prince upon his marriage, is still referred to as a "Joyous Entry", a reminder of this tradition of the rule of law.

Charter of liberties

In the Duchy of Brabant the term Joyous Entry was also applied to the charter of liberties that a new ruler was obliged to swear to uphold upon their formal first reception, dating back to the Joyous Entry of 1356. One of the functions of the Council of Brabant was to ensure that new legislation did not contravene or abrogate the liberties established in the Joyous Entry.

Kingdom of Belgium 
In Belgium this ceremonial reception of the new sovereign has continued since 1830. Ceremonial entries are performed by the new royal couple in the capitals of the provinces after the installation of the King. The same goes for the Duke of Brabant, who  after his marriage presents the new duchess of Brabant to the public. The most recent Joyous Entries were organised in honour of King Philippe and Queen Mathilde in 2013.

Some notable Joyous Entries
In 1356, the Joyous Entry into Brussels, by Joanna and her husband Wenceslaus I, Duke of Luxembourg, upon her becoming Duchess of Brabant on the death of her father John the Triumphant.
In 1407?, a Joyous Entry, by John the Fearless.
In 142?, a Joyous Entry, by Philip the Good.
In 1464, the Joyous Entry into Sopron, by King Matthias of Hungary, atypically mainly celebrating the return of the object of the Crown.
In 1467, the (not so very) 'Joyous' Entry into Ghent, by Charles the Bold.
In 1468, the Joyous Entry into Bruges, by Charles the Bold and Margaret of York.
In 1478, the Joyous Entry into Antwerp, by Maximilian of Austria.
In 1493?, the Joyous Entry into Mechelen, by Maximilian of Austria (and his young daughter Margarete)
In 1496, the Joyous Entry into Brussels, by Joanna the Mad.
In 1501, a tour of Joyous Entries throughout Hainaut, Picardy, Île-de-France, Champagne, Burgundy and Franche-Comté, by Philibert II, Duke of Savoy and Margarete of Austria upon their marriage, and the following year into Bourg-en-Bresse.
In 1507, the Joyous Entry into Mechelen, by Philibert's widow Margarete, returning as Regent of the Low Countries.
In 1515, the Joyous Entries into Bruges, Ghent, Antwerp, and Leiden, by young Prince Charles.

In 1520, the Joyous Entry into Bruges, by young King Charles
In 1548, the Joyous Entry into Lyon, by Henri II of Valois.
In 1549, a series of Joyous Entries into the Low Countries by Charles V and his son Philip II of Spain in (among other cities) Antwerp, Brussels and Bruges.
In 1550, the Joyous Entry into Rouen, by Henri II of Valois.
In 1561?, the (not so very) Joyous Entry into Mechelen, by Granvelle, as Archbishop.
In 1577, the (not so very) 'Joyous' Entry into Brussels, by Don John, as Governor of the Spanish Netherlands.
In 1578, the Joyous Entry into Brussels, by Prince Matthias, later the Magnificent.
In 1582, the Joyous Entry into Antwerp, Bruges, and Ghent, by François, Duke of Anjou.
In 1594, the Joyous Entry into Brussels and Antwerp, by Archduke Ernest of Austria
In 1590, the Entry into Edinburgh, by Anne of Denmark
In 1599–1600, a tour of Joyous Entries into Leuven, Brussels, Mechlin, Antwerp, Ghent, Bruges, Tournai, etc., by Archduke Albert and the Infanta Isabella.
In 1635, the Joyous Entry by the Cardinal-Infante Ferdinand into Antwerp (decorations designed by Gaspar Gevartius, Theodoor van Thulden and Rubens) and Ghent.
On 9 October 1725, Archduchess Maria Elisabeth of Austria made her Joyous Entry into Brussels as regent governor of the Austrian Netherlands.
In 1891, the Joyous Entry into Luxembourg, by Grand Duke Adolphe and his wife Adelheid.
On 22 November 1918, King Albert I entered Brussels with the Belgian Army of the Yser after four years of German occupation in World War I.

References

External links
Festival Books online from the British Museum – records of these and similar occasions
Festival books, mostly German from HAB Wolfenbüttel

Duchy of Brabant
County of Flanders
European court festivities
Belgian monarchy